Adam Joseph Maida (born March 18, 1930) is an American cardinal prelate of the Roman Catholic Church. Maida served as the archbishop of the Archdiocese of Detroit in Michigan from 1990 to 2009, and was elevated to cardinal in 1994. Maida previously served as bishop of the Diocese of Green Bay in Wisconsin from 1984 to 1990.

Biography

Early life and education
Maida was born on March 18, 1930, in East Vandergrift, Pennsylvania, to Adam and Sophie (née Cieslak) Maida. The oldest of three children, he has two brothers, Thaddeus (who also became a priest) and Daniel. His father immigrated from Poland at age 16, while his mother was the daughter of Polish immigrants. He and his brothers attended public schools in East Vandergrift since there were no local Catholic schools. Maida attended Vandergrift High School and Scott Township High School, each for one year.

During his sophomore year of high school, Maida decided to enter the priesthood.  He  entered St. Mary's Preparatory School in Orchard Lake Village, Michigan, graduating from there in 1948. He then entered St. Mary's College, also in Orchard Lake Village. In 1950, Maida transferred to Saint Vincent College in Latrobe, Pennsylvania, where he earned a Bachelor of Philosophy degree in 1952. He received a Licentiate of Sacred Theology from St. Mary's University in Baltimore, Maryland, in 1956.

Ordination and ministry
On May 26, 1956, Maida was ordained a priest for the Diocese of Pittsburgh by then Bishop John Dearden at the Cathedral of St. Paul in Pittsburgh. After his ordination, Maida's first assignment was as assistant pastor of St. Elizabeth of Hungary Parish in Pleasant Hills, Pennsylvania. He later served at Holy Innocents Parish in Sheraden, Pennsylvania.

In 1958, Bishop Dearden sent Maida to Rome to study at the Pontifical Lateran University, where he earned a Licentiate of Canon Law in 1960. He received his Juris Doctor from Duquesne University School of Law in Pittsburgh in 1964; he was admitted to practice law for the Commonwealth of Pennsylvania, the Federal Bar in Western Pennsylvania, and the U.S. Supreme Court.

Maida served as vice-chancellor and general counsel (1965–1983) of the diocese. In 1968, he was elected president of the Canon Law Society of America. He served on a papal commission to draft a due process procedure giving the laity legal recourse within the church, and participated in the revision of the Code of Canon Law; for the National Conference of Catholic Bishops, he worked on the adoption of a due process procedure and chaired the bishops' Canonical Affairs Committee.

Maida served as a member of the diocesan tribunal, assistant professor of theology at La Roche College in McCandless, Pennsylvania, and adjunct professor of law at Duquesne University Law School (1971–1983). He was also chaplain of the St. Thomas More Society.

Bishop of Green Bay
On November 8, 1983, Pope John Paul II appointed Maida as the ninth bishop of the Diocese of Green Bay. He received his episcopal consecration on January 25, 1984, from Archbishop Pio Laghi, with Bishops Aloysius Wycisło and Vincent Leonard serving as co-consecrators, at the Cathedral of St. Francis Xavier in Green Bay.

During his tenure in Green Bay, Maida appointed the diocese's first female chancellor and first female parish director. He also established a diocesan planning council and ministry formation program, initiated a diocesan census, implemented the RCIA process, and raised $9 million through Lumen Christi education endowment campaign.

Archbishop of Detroit

On April 28, 1990, John Paul II appointed Maida as the fourth archbishop of the Archdiocese of Detroit. He was installed on June 12, 1990. On November 26, 1994, John Paul II elevated Maida to the Sacred College of Cardinals as Cardinal-Priest of Ss. Vitale, Valeria, Gervasio e Protasio. In 2000, Maida was appointed the first superior of the Mission Sui Iuris of Cayman Islands.

In April 2005, following the death of John Paul II, Maida traveled to the Vatican as a cardinal elector to participate in the conclave that selected Pope Benedict XVI. Maida is no longer eligible to vote in any future conclaves as he reached his 80th birthday. On March 18, 2005, Maida sent his letter of resignation to Pope Benedict XVI, having reached the mandatory retirement age of 75. The Vatican asked Maida to remain archbishop until further notice. On June 8, 2006, Maida celebrated the 50th anniversary of his ordination to the priesthood.

In January 2007, Maida relieved Auxiliary Bishop Emeritus Thomas Gumbleton of his pastoral duties at St. Leo Parish in Detroit.  Gumbleton claimed he was being punished by Maida for his outspoken views on sexual abuse crimes by clergy.  Maida claimed that he was following church rules on retirement of bishops.

Retirement
On January 5, 2009, the Holy See announced acceptance of Maida's resignation and the appointment of Bishop Allen Vigneron, from the Diocese of Oakland, as his successor. Vigneron was installed on January 28, 2009, at the Cathedral of the Most Blessed Sacrament in Detroit Maida became apostolic administrator of the Archdiocese of Detroit and assisted Vigneron with the transition.

Maida celebrated his final mass at the cathedral on January 25, 2009. This was also held in celebration of the 25th anniversary of his consecration as a bishop.

See also

 Catholic Church hierarchy
 Catholic Church in the United States
 Historical list of the Catholic bishops of the United States
 List of Catholic bishops of the United States
 Lists of patriarchs, archbishops, and bishops

References

External links

 
Biography from the Archdiocese of Detroit (in PDF format)
Cardinal Adam Maida, The Cardinals of the Holy Roman Church
Roman Catholic Archdiocese of Detroit

1930 births
Living people
21st-century American cardinals
20th-century American cardinals
American people of Polish descent
American theologians
Catholics from Michigan
Catholics from Wisconsin
Cardinals created by Pope John Paul II
Duquesne University alumni
Duquesne University faculty
People from Westmoreland County, Pennsylvania
Religious leaders from Wisconsin
Roman Catholic archbishops of Detroit
Roman Catholic bishops of Green Bay
Saint Vincent College alumni
Catholic University of America trustees
People from Orchard Lake, Michigan
Catholics from Pennsylvania
St. Mary's Preparatory alumni